WJDR (98.3 FM) is a radio station broadcasting a News/Talk format. It is licensed to Prentiss, Mississippi, United States.  The station is currently owned by Sun Belt Broadcasting Corporation and features programming from Westwood One, Premiere Networks, and Fox News Radio.

References

External links

JDR
News and talk radio stations in the United States